is the remains of a castle structure in Nobeoka, Miyazaki Prefecture, Japan.

After the  battle of Sekigahara, Takahashi Mototane started building the castle. In 1655, Arima clan fortified the castle and built a 3 level main keep. However, it was burnt down by a fire in 1683 and was never rebuilt.
 
The castle is now only ruins, just some remnants of water moats and stone walls. Nobeoka castle was listed as one of the Continued Top 100 Japanese Castles in 2017.

Gallery

Literature

References

Castles in Miyazaki Prefecture
Former castles in Japan